Gilberd is a surname. Notable people with the surname include:

William Gilbert (physician) (1544?–1603), English physician, physicist, and natural philosopher
Bruce Gilberd (born 1938), New Zealand Anglican bishop

See also
The Gilberd School